Jefferson Township is an inactive township in Johnson County, in the U.S. state of Missouri.

Jefferson Township was established in 1835, taking its name from President Thomas Jefferson.

References

Townships in Missouri
Townships in Johnson County, Missouri